Bulwer may refer to:

People
 Henry Bulwer, 1st Baron Dalling and Bulwer (1801–1872), British politician, diplomat and writer
 Henry Ernest Gascoyne Bulwer (1836–1914), British colonial administrator and diplomat, nephew of Henry Bulwer
 James Bulwer (1794–1879), English collector, naturalist and conchologist
 James Redfoord Bulwer (1820–1899), British politician
 John Bulwer (1606–1656), English physician and writer
 Lorina Bulwer (1838-1912) Workhouse inmate and textile artist

Other
 Bulwer, Queensland, Australia
 Bulwer Island, Queensland, Australia
 Bulwer, New Zealand (in Pelorus Sound)
 Bulwer, KwaZulu-Natal, South Africa
 Bulwer's petrel (Bulweria bulwerii), named after James Bulwer
 Bulwer's pheasant (Lophura bulweri), named after Henry Ernest Gascoyne Bulwer
 Clayton–Bulwer Treaty, 1850 treaty between the United States and Great Britain

See also
 Bulwer-Lytton, a surname
 Bulweria